John Finlay (19 October 1882 – 31 March 1933) was a Scottish footballer who played as a left half for Rangers (where he played only once in the Scottish Football League in his first season as a professional), Airdrieonians (where he became an established top division regular over five years), and Newcastle United (where he was registered as a player for 15 years, though World War I interrupted his career and the last few seasons involved only a handful of appearances – by then he was also working as a trainer for the club, a position he held until 1930).

Finlay was selected once for the Scottish Football League XI in 1909, and in 1920 played in the Home Scots v Anglo-Scots international trial match, but he never received a full cap for Scotland.

References

1882 births
1933 deaths
Footballers from Kilmarnock
Scottish footballers
English Football League players
Association football wing halves
Newcastle United F.C. players
Newcastle United F.C. non-playing staff
Rangers F.C. players
Airdrieonians F.C. (1878) players
Scottish Football League players
Association football coaches